Ana Lilia Herrera Anzaldo (born 29 August 1971) is a Mexican politician affiliated with the PRI. She currently serves as Senator of the LXII Legislature of the Mexican Congress representing the Mexico state.

References

1971 births
Living people
Politicians from Mexico City
Women members of the Senate of the Republic (Mexico)
Members of the Senate of the Republic (Mexico)
Institutional Revolutionary Party politicians
21st-century Mexican politicians
21st-century Mexican women politicians
National Autonomous University of Mexico alumni
Instituto Tecnológico Autónomo de México alumni
Members of the Congress of the State of Mexico
Senators of the LXII and LXIII Legislatures of Mexico